Infirmary may refer to:
Historically, a hospital, especially a small hospital
A first aid room in a school, prison, or other institution
A dispensary (an office that dispenses medications)
A clinic